Saint Lawrence High School may refer to:

India
 St. Lawrence High School, in Kandivali, Mumbai, Maharashtra
 St. Lawrence School, in Borivali, Maharashtra
 St. Lawrence High School, Kolkata, in Kolkata, West Bengal
 St. Lawrence High School (Santa Cruz), in Santa Cruz, Mumbai, Maharashtra
 St. Lawrence High School (Vashi), in Navi Mumbai, Maharashtra
 St. Lawrence High School (Aurangabad), in Aurangabad, Maharashtra

United States
 St. Lawrence High School (Utica, Michigan)
 St. Lawrence Seminary High School, Mount Calvary, Wisconsin

See also
 St. Laurence High School